Martynivka Treasure (Martynivsky skarb) is a hoard consisting of 116 silver items (weighing about 3.3 kg) found in 1909, in the village of Martynivka, Cherkasy Oblast, Ukraine. The treasure is currently preserved at the National Historical Museum of Ukraine in Kyiv and the British Museum in London. It is dated approximately to the 6th-7th centuries AD.

Origin
Historians proposed different theories for the culture which this treasure could have belonged. The most popular hypothesis connects this hoard with Penkovo culture of Antes.

Description
The hoard includes four anthropomorphic silver figurines of 'dancing men' (Ukrainian newspapers sometimes refer to them as 'aliens' for their unusual appearance), five animal figurines, three fibulas, a radiate-head brooch, six armlets, tiaras, ear rings, neck rings, buckles, belt-fittings and horse harnesses. The style of figurines is sometimes considered as influenced by Huns, Bulgars or Avars.

References

Literature 
 Клейн Л. С. Пляшущие человечки Конан-Дойля на Руси // Троицкий вариант — Наука. № 99. С. 14.
 Корзухина Г. Ф. Клады и случайные находки вещей круга «Древностей антов» в Среднем Поднепровье. Каталог памятников // МАИЭТ. Вып. V. Симферополь, 1996. С. 352—425, 525—705.
 Рыбаков Б. А. Древние русы // Советская археология. Т. XVII. 1953. С. 76-89.

External links 
 Пеньковская (антская) культура
 Музейний простір України. Мартинівський скарб (VI—VII ст., Черкащина) (фото) (укр.)

Treasure troves in Ukraine
Medieval European objects in the British Museum
Medieval European metalwork objects